Burn Manor is a house near Stratton in Cornwall, England, UK, now used as the reception and offices for a Seasons time-share resort.

References

Houses in Cornwall